Tsunao Isomura is a former international table tennis player from Japan.

Table tennis career
She won a silver medal in the 1965 World Table Tennis Championships in the Corbillon Cup (women's team event) with Naoko Fukatsu, Masako Seki and Noriko Yamanaka for Japan.

She also won two Asian Games medals.

See also
 List of table tennis players
 List of World Table Tennis Championships medalists

References

Living people
Japanese female table tennis players
Asian Games medalists in table tennis
Table tennis players at the 1966 Asian Games
Asian Games gold medalists for Japan
Asian Games bronze medalists for Japan
Medalists at the 1966 Asian Games
World Table Tennis Championships medalists
Year of birth missing (living people)